Bainton is a  village and civil parish in the Peterborough unitary authority area of Cambridgeshire, England. At the time of the 2001 census, the parish's population was 305 people   and by the 2011 census the parish's population was 290 people.

History

Formerly known as 'Badingtun' (Old English meaning "estate associated with a man called Bada"), some form of settlement existed in c.980 but was not mentioned in the Domesday Book of 1086.

At the south-east of the parish of Bainton and adjacent to the nearby village of Helpston is the site of Torpel Manor which is a series of medieval and later earthworks that are a Scheduled Ancient Monument.

The medieval village cross called the Butter Cross is Grade I listed, as is the parish church. The church of St Mary dates back to the early 13th century, with additions such as the tower and spire which are 14th century.  The church includes a monument by Sir Richard Westmacott to Mary Henson who died in 1805.  The bell tower contains four bells but these are not able to be rung currently.

Bainton House used to be the home of the Birkbeck family and is a Grade II listed manor house dating back to the 16th century.

Transport
Bainton lies on the B1443.

To the north of Bainton, the Bainton Gate railway station briefly served the village between 1846 and its closure in 1856.  The nearest railway station is at Stamford  to the east.

References

External links

 Bainton and Ashton Parish Council web site
 Bainton Reading Room
 Bainton Conservation Area Map

Villages in Cambridgeshire
Geography of Peterborough
Civil parishes in Cambridgeshire